Shawaq (Quechua shawa Sambucus peruviana, -q a suffix, hispanicized spelling Shahuac) is a mountain in the Andes of Peru, about  high. It is located in the Junín Region, Yauli Province, Morococha District, north of a lake named Waqraqucha.

References

Mountains of Peru
Mountains of Junín Region